Koskovo is a rural locality (a village) in Kichmegnskoye Rural Settlement, Kichmengsko-Gorodetsky District, Vologda Oblast, Russia. The population was 26 as of 2002. There are 2 streets.

Geography 
Koskovo is located 20 km southeast of Kichmengsky Gorodok (the district's administrative centre) by road.

References 

Rural localities in Kichmengsko-Gorodetsky District